Weisswurst (German Weißwurst , literally white sausage) is a traditional Bavarian sausage made from minced veal and pork back bacon. It is usually flavored with parsley, lemon, mace, onions, ginger and cardamom, although there are some variations. Then the mixture is stuffed into pork casings and separated into individual sausages measuring about ten to twelve centimeters in length and three to four centimeters in thickness.

As they are not smoked or otherwise preserved they are very perishable. Weißwürste were traditionally manufactured early in the morning and prepared and eaten as a snack between breakfast and lunch. There is a saying that the sausages should not be allowed to hear the noon chime of the church bells. Even today, most Bavarians never eat Weißwürste after lunchtime (though it is perfectly acceptable to have a lunch consisting of Weißwürste at, say, half past one).

The sausages are heated in water—well short of boiling—for about ten minutes, which will turn them greyish-white because no color-preserving nitrite is used in Weisswurst preparation.

Weißwürste are brought to the table in a big bowl together with the hot water used for preparation (so they do not cool down too much), then eaten without their skins. Ways of eating Weißwurst include the traditional way, called zuzeln (Bavarian for sucking), in which each end of the sausage is cut or bitten open, after which the meat is sucked out from the skin. Alternatively, the more popular and more discreet ways of consuming it are by cutting the sausage lengthwise and then "rolling out" the meat from the skin with a fork, or also to open it on one end and consume it very much like a banana, ever opening the peel further and dipping the sausage into the mustard.

Weißwurst is commonly served with a Bavarian sweet mustard (Süßer Senf) and accompanied by Brezn (Bavarian Pretzel—often spelled Brezeln outside Bavaria) and Weißbier.

Weißwurst, whose consumption traditionally is associated with Bavaria, helped in the coining of a humorous term, Weißwurstäquator (literally, white sausage equator), that delineates a cultural boundary separating other linguistic and cultural areas from Southern Germany.

See also 

 Bockwurst
 Brühwurst
 List of veal dishes
 White hot

References

External links 

 Food from Bavaria published by the Bavarian Dept. for agriculture and forests
 The correct treatment of a Weißwurst - essay about preparing and eating Weißwurst properly (PDF file)

German sausages
Veal dishes
Bavarian cuisine
Culture in Munich
1853 introductions
Cooked sausages